The Voisin VIII was a French two-seat biplane pusher which was built in two versions, one fitted with a 37mm Hotchkiss cannon (the LBP or Ca.2), and the other as a conventional bomber (the LAP or Bn.2). Problems with the Peugeot engine led to a short operational career with front line units before being superseded by the Voisin X, which aside from the installation of a new Renault engine, was nearly identical to the VIII.

Development
With the failure of the 1915 and 1916 bomber contests to produce any usable types to replace the Voisin V, Voisin was asked to produce an interim type pending the development of the next generation of bombers. This was based partly on the preceding Voisin VII which was itself an enlarged V, but was to be powered by a larger engine as the VII was found to be underpowered, and would dispense with the nose radiator, reverting to drag-inducing side radiators. 

Two versions were to be built, a conventional bomber, and an aircraft armed with a large single shot 37mm Hotchkiss cannon as was used on the Voisin IV. Initially it was thought the cannon would be used for air-air attacks and was officially designated a cannon fighter (Ca.2) however this was found to be unworkable as both bomber and fighter types were vulnerable to fighters as they were too slow and unmaneuverable but at least one enemy aircraft was destroyed — with a single shot. As a result, a variety of other roles were attempted with it. Flying artillery, using indirect shots were impossible to aim accurately, balloon busting highlighted the type's vulnerability to anti-aircraft artillery fire, but some success was found with used in the ground attack firing directly at the target. Many had their cannons removed while in operational service but at least one was armed with additional machine guns. The LBP with the cannon had the pilot in the rear seat, while in the LAP, the pilot sat in the front seat, while the rear occupant could be equipped with a light machine gun such as a Lewis. On some aircraft, the observer's gun was mounted on a ring that was tilted to make movement forward easier against the wind. Unlike with the Voisin IV, installation of the cannon did not require that the top wing be staggered forward to maintain fore-aft balance.

Like the previous Voisins going back to the Voisin III, the Voisin VIII had a steel tube structure to provide adequate strength. Unusually for the period, and because it had no skid to drag it to a stop, it was equipped with drum brakes. These were fitted to the rear wheels. Like the Voisin VII, the VIII was fitted with two large strut mounted teardrop fuel tanks that could be jettisoned in the event of a fire. Due to problems with exhaust ventilation on the VII, the VIII and later types were fitted with tall individual exhaust stacks projecting above the top wing.

Operational history

French service
By the start of 1917, the Voisin VIII made up the bulk of the Aviation Militaire's night bombing force having gradually replaced the preceding Voisin V's and fully equipped two Groupes de Bombardment (GB 1 & GB 3) before the unreliability of their engines resulted in them being gradually replaced by French-built Sopwith 1½ Strutters and the higher powered Voisin Xs, and withdrawn to secondary units, which continued to operate them until the end of the war. The l'Aéronavale/Aviation Maritime operated 20 Voisin VIIIs.

American service
Based on the experiences of some Americans serving with these aircraft, the United States' American Expeditionary Force planned to field a single night bomber unit equipped with the Voisin VIII, however only a training unit was formed before the war ended.

British service
The Royal Naval Air Service purchased two examples for trials work, one fitted with the cannon, and one of the bomber types, however no further examples were purchased.

Variants
Voisin VIII 
 Peugeot 8Aa
Voisin LAP - factory designation for VIII night bomber
Voisin LBP - factory designation for VIII armed with  cannon 

Voisin IX
lightened one-off prototype with  Renault 8Gb for reconnaissance, with radiator in rounded nose
Voisin LC - factory designation for IX

Voisin X
re-engined VIII with  Renault 12Fe
Voisin LAR - factory designation for X night bomber
Voisin LBR - factory designation for X armed with  cannon 
Voisin XI 
Variant of X with  Panhard 12Bc and minor changes to proportions but only around 10 built

Operators
 
Aéronautique Militaire
Ecole Militaire d'Avord
VB.101
V.481/551 operated alongside Letord 4 & 5
G.482 operated alongside Caudron G.6 aircraft
VB.483
V.484
Let.485 operated alongside Letord 4 aircraft
V.486
V.487 operated alongside Letord 4 & 5 aircraft
V.491 operated alongside Letord 4 aircraft
 1
VB.110
VB.114 first unit to receive type
 3
VB.107
VB.108
VB.109
VB.113
l'Aéronavale/Aviation Maritime
 de Dunkerque

Royal Naval Air Service

American Expeditionary Force

Survivors/Aircraft on display
 National Air and Space Museum has a Voisin VIII/LAP bomber on display 
 Musée de l'air et de l'espace has a fuselage of a Voisin X/LBR equipped with a cannon.

Specifications

See also

References

Citations

Bibliography

Further reading

 

08
1910s French bomber aircraft
Single-engined pusher aircraft
Biplanes
Military aircraft of World War I
Aircraft first flown in 1916